Aiquile Airport  is a public use airport serving Aiquile in the Cochabamba Department of Bolivia. The runway is in the southern section of the town.

See also

Transport in Bolivia
List of airports in Bolivia

References

External links 
OpenStreetMap - Aiquile
OurAirports - Aiquile
Fallingrain - Aiquile Airport
Bing Maps - Aiquile

Airports in Cochabamba Department